Spratleys Japs are an English psychedelic rock band formed by Cardiacs leader Tim Smith and Joanne Spratley in 1998. The band changed their name to Tim Smith's Spratleys Rats in 2021 to distance themselves from the negative connotations of the derogatory term Jap.

History

Original Line-up (1998-1999) 
The band were known to have been inspired by the sound of a malfunctioning Mellotron loaned to Tim Smith by Planet Mellotron coordinator Andy Thompson. The Mellotron is used extensively on the original Spratleys Japs recordings. (It has since been repaired).

The band's original line-up was Tim Smith (bass guitar, vocals, Mellotron), Joanne Spratley (vocals, flugelhorn, Theremin), Heidi Murphy (electronics devices and synthesisers), Mark Donovan (guitar) and Viv Sherriff (drums). Murphy, Donovan and Sherriff were allegedly members of a band called the Rev-Ups, which initially formed near Mexico but subsequently moved to the New Forest area of England. Since the original Spratleys Japs and the Rev-Ups have never played live, it's been suggested that both they and the original band were fictional.

Spratleys Japs released one album—1999's Pony—and one single, 1999's "Hazel". Both of these were released on Smith's own All My Eye And Betty Martin Music label. The album sold several hundred copies and the band never performed its material live before the split-up.

Joanne Spratley went on to work with Christian Hayes' project MIKROKOSMOS.

Revival (2016–present)
In 2016 Joanne Spratley's son Jesse Cutts suggested they should form a band together and in autumn that year she organized a Spratleys Japs concert in Brighton. It took place on 19 November and was billed as "Spratleys Japs Performed Live". The concert did not feature Tim Smith, who remained unable to perform following his 2008 stroke and heart attack (although he attended as an audience member) but did feature Spratley plus musicians drawn from various Brighton bands including Clowwns, Crayola Lectern, Muddy Suzuki and Heavy Lamb.

The concert led in turn to a full revival of Spratleys Japs featuring the new lineup, which includes, alongside Joanne and the bassist Cutts, Adrien Rodes (keyboards), Étienne Rodes (guitars), and Damo Waters (drums). They did assorted concerts in England during 2017, including a small tour.

On 18 December 2018, the single "Her/Hands" was released, Tim Smith credited as its executive producer, followed by a Christmas gig at the Garage club to celebrate an Honorary Degree as Doctor of Music from the Royal Conservatoire of Scotland Smith had received in October. On 4 February 2019, the band had a session with Marc Riley. On 17 May 2019, they supported Gong at Oslo (Hackney) and planned to release the new album by the end of the year.

On 5 June 2021 Joanne Spratley announced on Facebook that the band would be changing its name to Tim Smith's Spratleys Rats after discovering the offensive nature of the term Japs to some people. The original name had innocent origins, as Joanne Spratley explained, "When we named the band we thought [japs] sounded like some sweets that you got in a paper bag when you was a kid weighed out by the man behind the counter from one of them big dusty jars." "Spratleys Rats" was a suggestion from Marina Organ, with the addition of Tim Smith's name by Joanne Spratley to commemorate the band's original composer, who died in July 2020.

Members 
According to Eric Benac:

Original line-up

 Tim Smith – bass, vocals, Mellotron
 Joanne Spratley – vocals, flugelhorn, theremin
 Heidy Murphy – electronic devices and synthesizers
 Mark Donovan – guitar
 Viv Sherriff – drums

2016 Revival
 Joanne Spratley – vocals
 Jesse Cutts – bass
 Adrien Rodes – keyboards
 Étienne Rodes – guitars
 Damo Waters – drums

Discography

Albums
 Pony (1999)

Singles and EPs

 Hazel EP (1999), AME CD002
 "Odd Even" (2017)
 Her/Hands 7" (2018)
 Confinement/release6 (2020)

Notes

References

External links 
 Cardiacs Museum

English psychedelic rock music groups
English progressive rock groups
English art rock groups
English indie rock groups
English experimental musical groups
Musical groups established in 1998